MSF (Major Street-basketball Foundation) is a basketball-dedicated group in Australia that promotes the sport of basketball by working on positive projects. Ranging from basketball events, professional camps, influencing outdoor court upgrades, and many other initiatives that ultimately benefit the sport and the youth.

MSF was founded in Melbourne by basketball visionaries David Coles and Andre Gorgievski, in February 2002. From personal experiences with basketball, David and Andre both decided to step up and make something happen. MSF's vision is to promote and develop the game of basketball on all levels by creating greater opportunities and experiences of the game for everybody.

MSF has initiated one of Australia's most recognised 3-on-3 basketball tournaments at the Royal Melbourne Show and Moomba Waterfest, two of Australia's largest community festivals.

External links
 MSF Official Website
 Go-ahead basketball needs a network to net new audience

Basketball in Australia